Contact! Contact! is the debut studio album by English indie rock band Tellison, initially released on 14 May 2007 on Gravity DIP Records. It was later re-released on 12 November 2007 on Banquet Records.

The album was recorded over a six-month period between Scotland and England with two producers, Robin Sutherland and Nicolaas Weststeyn.

Track listing 
All lyrics written by Stephen Davidson; music composed by Tellison.

Release history

Personnel 
The following personnel contributed to Contact! Contact!:

Tellison 
 Stephen H Davidson — lead vocals, rhythm guitar, lyrics
 Peter J Phillips — lead guitar, vocals, keyboards
 Andrew J Tickell — bass guitar, backing vocals
 Henry S Danowski — drums, percussion, keyboards

Additional musicians 
 Al Brown - violin

Production 
 Robin Sutherland - producer
 Nicolaas Weststeyn - co-producer
 Pat Collier - mixing
 Kimberley Rosen - mastering
 Alex Curtis - artwork, design

References

External links 
 Official Website
 Official MySpace

2007 debut albums
Tellison albums